The  are the prehistoric humans known from many bones found in the Yamashita limestone cave located on the grounds of the Yamashita First Cave Site Park in Naha, Okinawa, Japan.  The remains have been dated at 32,000±1000 years ago.
 The most important bones found in the cave in Yamashita are those of an approximately 6 to 8-year-old girl.

See also
 Minatogawa Man
 Pinza-Abu Cave Man
 Shiraho Saonetabaru Cave Ruins
 History of the Ryukyu Islands

References

Archaeology of Japan
Upper Paleolithic Homo sapiens fossils
Peopling of East Asia
Paleolithic Japan